The 1955 German motorcycle Grand Prix was the fourth round of the 1955 Grand Prix motorcycle racing season. It took place on 26 June 1955 at the Nürburgring circuit.

500 cc classification

350 cc classification

250 cc classification

125 cc classification

Sidecar classification

References

German motorcycle Grand Prix
German
German Motorcycle Grand Prix